The Sempron is a name used for AMD's low-end CPUs, replacing the Duron processor. The name was introduced in 2004, and processors with this name continued to be available for the FM2/FM2+ socket in 2015.

Features overview

Desktop processors

Sempron

"Thoroughbred-B" (Socket A, 130 nm, Model 8)
 All models support: MMX, SSE, Enhanced 3DNow!

"Thorton" (Socket A, 130 nm, Model 10)
 All models support: MMX, SSE, Enhanced 3DNow!

"Barton" (Socket A, 130 nm, Model 10)
 All models support: MMX, Extended MMX, SSE, 3DNow!, Enhanced 3DNow!

"Paris" (Socket 754, CG, 130 nm)
 All models support: MMX, SSE, SSE2, Enhanced 3DNow!, NX bit

"Palermo" (Socket 754, D0, E3 & E6, 90 nm)
 All models support: MMX, SSE, SSE2, Enhanced 3DNow!, NX bit
 SSE3 supported by: all models with an OPN ending in BO and BX
 AMD64 supported by: all models with an OPN ending in BX and CV
 Cool'n'Quiet supported by: 3000+ and higher models

"Palermo" (Socket 939, E3 & E6, 90 nm)
 All models support: MMX, SSE, SSE2, SSE3, Enhanced 3DNow!, NX bit
 AMD64 supported by: all models with an OPN ending in BW

"Manila" (Socket AM2, F2, 90 nm)
 All models support: MMX, SSE, SSE2, SSE3, Enhanced 3DNow!, NX bit, AMD64
 Cool'n'Quiet supported by: 3200+ and higher models

"Manila" (Socket AM2, Energy Efficient Small Form Factor, F2, 90 nm)
 All models support: MMX, SSE, SSE2, SSE3, Enhanced 3DNow!, NX bit, AMD64
 Cool'n'Quiet supported by: 3200+ and higher models

"Sparta" (Socket AM2, Energy Efficient, G1 & G2, 65 nm)
 All models support: MMX, SSE, SSE2, SSE3, Enhanced 3DNow!, NX bit, AMD64, Cool'n'Quiet

"Brisbane" (Socket AM2, Dual-core, G1 & G2, 65 nm)
 All models support: MMX, SSE, SSE2, SSE3, Enhanced 3DNow!, NX bit, AMD64, Cool'n'Quiet

"Sargas" (Socket AM3, Single-core, C2 & C3, 45 nm)
 Chip harvests from Regor with one core disabled
 All models support: MMX, SSE, SSE2, SSE3, SSE4a, ABM, Enhanced 3DNow!, NX bit, AMD64, Cool'n'Quiet, AMD-V

"Regor" (Socket AM3, Dual-core, C3, 45 nm)
 All models support: MMX, SSE, SSE2, SSE3, SSE4a, ABM, Enhanced 3DNow!, NX bit, AMD64, Cool'n'Quiet, AMD-V

FM2/FM2+ Semprons (Socket FM2, Dual-core, 32 nm)
Piledriver microarchitecture, Trinity/Richland core
 All models support: MMX, SSE, SSE2, SSE3, SSSE3, SSE4a, SSE4.1, SSE4.2, AMD64, AMD-V, AES, CLMUL, AVX 1.1, XOP, FMA3, FMA4, F16C, ABM, BMI1, TBM

"Kabini" (Socket AM1, Dual-core or Quad-core, 28 nm)
 All models support: MMX, SSE, SSE2, SSE3, SSSE3, SSE4a, SSE4.1, SSE4.2, AMD64, AVX, F16C, CLMUL, AES, MOVBE (Move Big-Endian instruction), ABM, BMI1, AMD-V

Mobile processors

Mobile Sempron

"Dublin" (Socket 754, CG, 130 nm, Desktop replacement)
 All models support: MMX, SSE, SSE2, Enhanced 3DNow!, NX bit

"Dublin" (Socket 754, CG, 130 nm, Low power)
 All models support: MMX, SSE, SSE2, Enhanced 3DNow!, NX bit

"Georgetown" (Socket 754, D0, 90 nm, Desktop replacement)
 All models support: MMX, SSE, SSE2, Enhanced 3DNow!, NX bit

"Sonora" (Socket 754, D0, 90 nm, Low power)
 All models support: MMX, SSE, SSE2, Enhanced 3DNow!, NX bit

"Albany" (Socket 754, E6, 90 nm, Desktop replacement)
 All models support: MMX, SSE, SSE2, SSE3, Enhanced 3DNow!, NX bit

"Roma" (Socket 754, E6, 90 nm, Low power)
 All models support: MMX, SSE, SSE2, SSE3, Enhanced 3DNow!, NX bit

"Keene" (Socket S1, F2, 90 nm, Low power)
 All models support: MMX, SSE, SSE2, SSE3, Enhanced 3DNow!, NX bit, AMD64, PowerNow!

"Sherman" (Socket S1, G1 & G2, 65 nm, Low power)
 All models support: MMX, SSE, SSE2, SSE3, Enhanced 3DNow!, NX bit, AMD64

"Sable" (65 nm)
 All models support: MMX, SSE, SSE2, SSE3, Enhanced 3DNow!, NX bit, AMD64, PowerNow!

"Huron" (65 nm, Low power)

 All models support: MMX, SSE, SSE2, SSE3, Enhanced 3DNow!, NX bit, AMD64, PowerNow!

"Caspian" (45 nm)
 All models support: MMX, SSE, SSE2, SSE3, SSE4a, Enhanced 3DNow!, NX bit, AMD64, PowerNow!, AMD-V

Notes

See also
 Sempron
 List of AMD Athlon XP processors
 List of AMD Athlon 64 processors
 List of AMD Turion processors
 Table of AMD processors

References

External links

 https://web.archive.org/web/20080103192839/http://products.amd.com/en-us/NotebookCPUFilter.aspx
 https://www.amd.com/us-en/Processors/ProductInformation/0,,30_118_609,00.html?redir=CPT301 (AMD's pricing page)
 https://web.archive.org/web/20050812003814/http://h18000.www1.hp.com/products/quickspecs/12105_na/12105_na.HTML (includes information on Socket 939 Semprons)
 https://web.archive.org/web/20051026082412/http://www.xbitlabs.com/articles/cpu/display/sempron-3000_2.html (info on Socket 939 3000+)
 https://web.archive.org/web/20051026081750/http://www.xbitlabs.com/articles/cpu/display/sempron-3000_4.html (more info on Socket 939 Semprons)
 http://www.digital-daily.com/cpu/sempron_3000_939/ (more recent info about Socket 939 Semprons)

Sempron
AMD Sempron